Rathaus Schöneberg is the city hall for the borough of Tempelhof-Schöneberg in Berlin. From 1949 until 1990 it served as the seat of the state senate of West Berlin and from 1949 until 1991 as the seat of the Governing Mayor.

History

The sandstone building was constructed between 1911 and 1914, when it replaced the old town hall of Schöneberg, at that time an independent city not yet incorporated into Greater Berlin, which took place in 1920. The Nazi authorities had a series of war murals by Franz Eichhorst added to the interior in 1938. In World War II the building was severely damaged by Allied bombing and during the final Battle of Berlin.

After the war the undestroyed Neues Stadthaus, former head office of Berlin's municipal fire insurance Feuersozietät, on Parochialstraße in Mitte, served as intermittent city hall, replacing the ruined Rotes Rathaus (Red City Hall, also in East Berlin), the traditional seat of the Berlin government. With the division of Berlin's city government and administration in September 1948 the Neues Stadthaus was in the Communist Ostsektor (eastern sector) and became off limits to West Berlin. As a "temporary" measure the barely repaired Rathaus Schöneberg on Rudolph-Wilde-Platz became the city hall for West Berlin. In 1950 the Freedom Bell (Freiheitsglocke), a gift by the United States, was installed in the rebuilt tower.

During the Berlin Blockade, the Uprising of 1953, and the Hungarian Revolution of 1956, Rudolph-Wilde-Platz in front of the building became a gathering place for protest rallies. After the construction of the Berlin Wall in 1961, the steps of Rathaus Schöneberg were the location where U.S. President John F. Kennedy spoke on 26 June 1963, proclaiming "Ich bin ein Berliner". On the night of his assassination, several thousand Berliners spontaneously gathered at the square, which was officially renamed John-F.-Kennedy-Platz three days later. A large memorial plaque, mounted on a column at the entrance of the building, and the room above the entrance overlooking the square are dedicated to Kennedy and his visit.

There was a large assembly in front of the Rathaus on 10 November 1989, the day after the fall of the Berlin Wall. Prominent people attending were chancellor Helmut Kohl, former chancellor Willy Brandt, and foreign minister Hans-Dietrich Genscher.

After reunification, Rathaus Schöneberg reverted to its original purpose of being Schöneberg Borough Town Hall. Upon the 2001 Berlin administrative reform, Rathaus Schöneberg became the town hall for the newly constituted borough of Tempelhof-Schöneberg.

It was also the permanent home to an exhibition of the life of Willy Brandt (1913–1992), Mayor of West Berlin from 1957 to 1966 and Chancellor of the Federal Republic of Germany 1969–74. The exhibition was closed as from January 2010; it is planned to open again at another site in the city.

Since 2005, the exhibition called Wir waren Nachbarn – Biografien jüdischer Zeitzeugen (English title:We were Neighbours once – Biographies of Jews in Schöneberg and Tempelhof under the Nazi Regime) takes place in the exhibition hall of the Rathaus Schöneberg.

References

External links
Listen to the Freedom Bell

Buildings and structures completed in 1914
Buildings and structures in Tempelhof-Schöneberg
City and town halls in Germany
Articles containing video clips